Murder in LaMut is a fantasy novel by American writers  Raymond E. Feist and Joel Rosenberg, the second book in the Legends of the Riftwar series. Set in the fictional world of Midkemia, the book takes place chronologically during the events of Magician.

Plot
Murder in LaMut details the story of Durine, Kethol and Pirojil, three mercenaries who have spent the past twenty five years fighting Tsurani, the Bugs and Goblins. Now having spent a few months on garrison duty, their journey to LaMut should be simple and completely straightforward.

Release
It was first released by Voyager (an imprint of HarperCollins) on June 5, 2002, in the United Kingdom. It was published in the United States by HarperCollins USA in 2008.

References

Murder in LaMut (US Edition) at Crydee
Murder in LaMut (UK Edition) at Crydee

2002 American novels
2002 fantasy novels
American fantasy novels
HarperCollins books
Novels by Raymond E. Feist
Novels by Joel Rosenberg